Ednan is a given name. Notable people with the name include:

Ednan Agaev (born 1956), Soviet and Russian diplomat
Ednan Karabayev (born 1953), Kyrgyzstan foreign minister
Ednan Shahid, leader of The Post

See also
Edna (disambiguation)